Ángeles Montolio (born 6 August 1975) is a former tennis player from Spain.

Montolio reached a career-high ranking of world No. 22 in February 2002, and won three WTA Tour titles at the small events in Porto, Estoril, and Bol, as well as reaching the finals of Madrid and Palermo. Her best results in Grand Slam tournaments were appearances in the third round of the Wimbledon Championships in 2001, and of the US Open in 1999 and 2001.

As a junior, she won the 1993 Orange Bowl for over-18s.

WTA career finals

Singles: 5 (3 titles, 2 runner-ups)

ITF Circuit finals

Singles (12–6)

Doubles (1–3)

Grand Slam singles performance timeline

External links
 
 
 

Spanish female tennis players
Tennis players from Barcelona
1975 births
Living people
Sportswomen from Catalonia